Peter James Leonard Klatzow (14 July  1945 – 29 December 2021) was a South African composer and pianist. He was the director of the College of Music and was an emeritus professor in composition at the University of Cape Town.

Life and career 
Klatzow's earliest musical training (at about age five years) was at the Roman Catholic convent of Saint Imelda in Brakpan.

After completing his schooling at St. Martin's School, Rosettenville, Johannesburg he briefly taught music and Afrikaans at the Waterford Kamhlaba School in Swaziland.

Klatzow moved to London in 1964 to study for a year at the Royal College of Music after being awarded a composition scholarship from the South African Music Rights Organisation composition scholarship which allowed him to go to the (RCM) in London to study. His professors included Gordon Jacob (orchestration), Kathleen Long (piano), and Bernard Stevens (composition). He won several prizes for composition while at the school. He later studied in Italy and then with Nadia Boulanger in Paris.

He returned to South Africa in 1966, where he worked for the SABC in Johannesburg as a music producer. In 1973 he was appointed to the South African College of Music in Cape Town where he later became professor in composition and director. Klatzow died in Cape Town on 29 December 2021, at the age of 76.

Works 
Klatzow has composed choral works, including liturgical pieces, orchestral works, and ballet music.

Music 
 Still-life with Moonbeams (1974) Symphonic Poem
 Dances of Earth and Fire: Marimba Solo (1988)
 Chamber concerto for 7 (1979)
 Inyanga: marimba solo (2007)
 Hamlet: The Ballet (1991)
 Ach, Bach: for Organ (1987)
 Six Concert Etudes for Marimba
 Music for 3 Paintings by Irma Stern
 Mass
 Two Songs from the /Xam
 Sonata for cello and piano
 Magnificat and Nunc Dimittis

Recordings 
 Fantasy on Japanese Woodprints, Op. 211 (1990) (Alan Hovhaness, Peter Klatzow, Frank Nuyts)
 A Programme of Piano Music from South Africa (Arnold Van Wyk, Peter Klatzow, Roelof Temmingh, David Kosviner, Jill Richards)
 Towards the light – a selection of choral works recorded in Oxford by the Commotio choir, under the direction of Matthew Berry.

Books

Awards 
 Joint winner of the 1977 International Composers' Competition
 Twice winner of the Helgard Steyn award: in 1994 for From the Poets and again in 2014 for Lightscapes
 Doctor of Music awarded by UCT in 1999
Huberte Rupert Music Prize by the Academy of Science of South Africa for his lifetime work in 2011

References

Citations

Sources

Further reading

External links 
 
 
 "Makoemazaan" for piano solo, performed by Gintaras Januševičius

1945 births
2021 deaths
Afrikaner people
South African composers
South African male composers
20th-century composers
20th-century South African musicians
20th-century male musicians
20th-century classical pianists
21st-century composers
21st-century classical pianists
21st-century South African musicians
21st-century male musicians
People from Springs, Gauteng
Alumni of the Royal College of Music
Recipients of the Molteno medal